The New York State Association Opposed to Woman Suffrage (NYSAOWS) was an American anti-suffrage organization in New York. The group was made up of prominent women who fought against the cause of women's suffrage by giving speeches, handing out materials and pamphlets and also publishing a journal. There were several auxiliaries of the group throughout New York and it was considered one of the most active anti-suffrage groups in the state.

History 
The New York State Association Opposed to Woman Suffrage (NYSAOWS) was one of the most active women's anti-suffrage groups in the state of New York. The group was first known as the New York State Association Opposed to the Extension of the Suffrage to Women and was formed in April 1895. The name was changed sometime between October 27, 1908 and November 4, 1908. The group had many "prominent" women from New York as members. There were several auxiliary organizations in different parts of the state, including in Albany, Brooklyn and Buffalo. Dues were taken from each member, starting at $3 per person.

The president of the organization would bring together the executive committee every year, either in December or April. Officers would be elected and reports on their previous years' activities would be shared. The report would also include information about women's suffrage efforts across the country. The group met at the home of  Mrs. George Phillips (Mary E. Phillips) for many years, but in October 1908 opened an office in the Engineering Societies' Building. In July 1908, NYSAOWS started a quarterly journal called The Anti-Suffragist which was published through April 1912.

NYSAOWS members believed that women participating in politics would be "disruptive of everything pertaining to home life." They also felt that women's roles as mothers and caregivers meant they did not have to do "further service" as citizens. Overall, the members believed that more people were on their side and all they had to do was help "women to recognize the vital need for 'a division of the world's work between men and women.'" In 1896, NYSAOWS believed that only 10% of women actually wanted the vote. NYSAOWS also used tactics such as associating women's suffrage with "support for socialist causes."

The group would receive requests for information, advice or assistance from women in other states. They also sent petitions to the New York State Assembly, asking them not to grant suffrage to women. The association drew large crowds, like the one at Glens Falls City Hall in February 1915, when NYSAOWS president, Alice Hill Chittenden, spoke.

After women in New York won the right to vote in 1917, NYSAOWS reorganized to work towards the repeal of women's suffrage. They also decided to fight against a country-wide granting of women's suffrage. After the 19th Amendment passed, the Brooklyn Auxiliary of the NYSAOWS met in the home of Carolyn Putnam (Mrs. W.A Putnam) to discuss working against the federal amendment. NYSAOWS eventually decided to transition into a new organization, the Women Voters' Anti-Suffrage Party.

Presidents 
Several women served as presidents of the group. Abby Hamlin Abbot filled in for Scott and Dodge left to lead the National Association Opposed to Woman Suffrage.

 Lucy Parkman Scott (1895-1910) 
 Abby Hamlin Abbott parts of 1902 and 1907
 Josephine Jewell Dodge (1910)
 Carolyn Putnam (1911-1912)
 Alice Hill Chittenden (1913-1917)

See also 

 Anti-suffragism
 Women's suffrage in the United States
 The National Association Opposed to Woman Suffrage

References

Citations

Sources

External links 
 New York State Association Opposed to Woman Suffrage Collection

1895 establishments in New York (state)
Anti-suffragist organizations
Women's organizations based in the United States
Criticism of feminism
Women in New York (state)